The Hell with Heroes (A Time for Heroes and Run Hero Run) is a 1968 American drama film directed by Joseph Sargent (his first feature directorial effort) set in Africa immediately after World War II. The film stars Rod Taylor, Claudia Cardinale and Kevin McCarthy.

Plot
In 1946, after fighting in World War II, two former United States Army Air Forces pilots in North Africa, Brynie MacKay (Rod Taylor) and Mike Brewer (Pete Duel) are forced to work for Lee Harris (Harry Guardino), an international smuggler to get money needed for their return to civilian life.  The smuggler wants them to fly to France, with Egyptian cotton cargo. When Brynie finds that their real cargo is contraband cigarettes, he extorts Harris for more money. In retaliation, Harris plants narcotics on Brynie's aircraft and informs Colonel Wilson (Kevin McCarthy) at U. S. Counterintelligence.

With Byrnie's aircraft impounded and his money seized, Elena (Claudia Cardinale), Harris's mistress comes to his aid. Harris exacts a promise for 12 more illegal cargo flights, but Mike warns that they will both be killed if they go ahead with this scheme. When Mike tries to trap Harris by informing Col. Wilson about the smuggling runs, Harris, who is flying with the two pilots, kills Mike, but is knocked out by Byrnie.

Fearing Harris's gang is waiting for him at the prearranged destination, Byrnie lands his aircraft at an abandoned military air strip and informs Wilson where the contraband can be found.  With Elena at his side, Byrnie then escapes to North Africa. When Harris tracks them down, Brynie overcomes Harris and turns him over to Wilson, and because of the deal Mike had made, is released. Byrnie decides to return to the United States with Elena and become a teacher, his former profession.

Cast

Production
Although by this stage in his film career, Rod Taylor was a reasonably big film star, the producers could get him cheaply for this film under an old multi-picture contract he had signed with Universal in 1962. Pete Duel was starting the first film as a Universal contract player.

Reception
The Hell with Heroes did not receive positive critical reviews. In his review for The Hollywood Reporter, John Mahoney wrote that the film "... is a trite and unpleasant tale ... you are aware that the director is trying to punch up deficient material." In the review at The Motion Picture Herald, the commentator noted that The Hell with Heroes was "... in the tradition of old-fashioned melodrama, which is essentially what this picture basically is."

See also
List of American films of 1968

References

Bibliography

 Green, Paul. Pete Duel: A Biography, 2d ed. Jefferson, North Carolina: McFarland & Company, 2007. .
 Vagg, Stephen. Rod Taylor: An Aussie in Hollywood. Albany, Georgia: Bear Manor Media, 2010. .

External links
 
 
 The Hell with Heroes at the Rod Taylor Site

1968 drama films
1968 films
American aviation films
Films scored by Quincy Jones
Films directed by Joseph Sargent
Films set in 1946
Films set in Algeria
Universal Pictures films
Films with screenplays by Harold Livingston
1968 directorial debut films
1960s English-language films
1960s American films